The Original Prague Syncopated Orchestra (Czech: Originální Pražský Synkopický Orchestr or OPSO) is a Czech jazz band formed in Prague, in what was then Czechoslovakia, in 1974. It is best known for painstaking reconstructions of performances of music of the 1920s, using authentic instruments, and improvisation in the style of the time.

The initial line-up in 1974 was a five-man band (three wind instruments, piano and banjo) under the artistic direction of musicologist Pavel Klikar. Three more members joined in 1976: a second saxophone, a violin, and vocalist Ondřej Havelka. In May 1978 the band came to European prominence playing at the Festival of Old Jazz in Breda, the Netherlands. That autumn the band expanded to twelve members.

During the 1980s, the ensemble's live concerts regularly featured lyrics in English, but broadcast performances did not.

In 1995 the band split, with Havelka founding a rival group that eventually adopted the name Ondřej Havelka and his Melody Makers.

The Original Prague Syncopated Orchestra continues to perform, and is well known for open-air performances on the Charles Bridge in Prague.

Discography
 Originální Pražský Synkopický Orchestr (1976, SP Panton)
 Ragtime - 2 skladby na LP (1977, LP Supraphon)
 Original Prague Syncopated Orchestra at Breda Jazz Festival (1979, LP Jazz Crooner, Holland)
 Originální Pražský Synkopický Orchestr (1979, LP Supraphon & WAM – Germany)
 Srdce Mé Odešlo Za Tebou - 2 skladby (1980, SP Panton)
 Stará Natoč Gramofon (1982, LP Panton + reed. CD)
 Jazz & Hot Dance Music 1923 - 31 (1984, LP Panton + reed. CD)
 Sám s Děvčetem v Dešti (1989, LP Panton + reed. CD)
 Hello Baby (1994, CD EMI – Monitor)
 Walking and Swinging (1996, CD EMI – Monitor)
 Blues pro Tebe (1998, CD EMI – Monitor)
 Goin' Crazy with The Blues (2002, CD BWS)
 Sweet Like This (2006, CD BWS)

References

External links
Official website.

Czech jazz ensembles